The  is a river found in the heart of Tokushima City in Tokushima Prefecture. The Suketō River, Tamiya River, Sako River, and Sumiyoshijima River are its tributaries.

At current, the non-profit organization Shinmachi Preservation Committee is in charge of keeping the river clean and holding tours around the river via boat.

History 
During the Edo period the Shinmachi River was a very busy area due to the travel of boats carrying indigo dyeing wares, one of the main trades supporting finance in the region at the time.

Geography 
The Shinmachi River runs through the middle of Tokushima, and passes by many well known tourist spots within the city area.

Water 
Up until the early Shōwa period, the condition of the river was so good as to allow people to swim there during the summertime. However, in the coming years the river became increasingly polluted and thus unsuitable for swimming. Efforts in recent years to clean up the river have improved its overall condition greatly, but there still remains some sludge on the bottom of the river and it has yet to return to its former glory.

Main events along the waterway

Events 
The Aibahama Park and Mizugiwai Park areas along the riverside are popular spots for events. The river itself is also used during an event each Christmas, in which people dressed in Santa suits distribute gifts to children along the riverside from atop boats. Over 3,000 presents are given out each year.

Tourist spots 
Tokushima City is home to many different historical sites due to its long history as the capital city in the region.

References

Rivers of Tokushima Prefecture
Rivers of Japan